On 5 July 2021, an armed gang carried out a mass kidnapping in Chikun, Nigeria.

At about 1:45 am on 5 July 2021, a bandit gang kidnapped over 140 pupils from Bethel Baptist Secondary School in Kujuma, Chikun, Kaduna State, Nigeria.  26 pupils and a teacher were rescued.

References

2021 crimes in Nigeria
21st century in Kaduna State
Attacks on buildings and structures in 2021
Attacks on schools in Nigeria
Crime in Kaduna State
July 2021 crimes in Africa
July 2021 events in Nigeria
Kidnappings in Nigeria
Mass kidnappings of the 2020s
Nigerian bandit conflict